The Voice of Germany is a German reality talent show created by John de Mol, based on the concept The Voice of Holland and its international series. It began airing on ProSieben and Sat.1 on 24 November 2011.

There are five different stages to the show: producers' auditions, blind auditions, battle rounds, sign offs, and live shows. There have been twelve winners to date: Ivy Quainoo, Nick Howard, Andreas Kümmert, Charley Ann Schmutzler, Jamie-Lee Kriewitz, Tay Schmedtmann, Natia Todua, Samuel Rösch, Claudia Emmanuela Santoso, Paula Dalla Corte, Sebastian Krenz, and the latest Anny Ogrezeanu. 

The show was originally presented by Stefan Gödde. Since 2012, Thore Schölermann has presented the show. From 2015 until 2021, Schölermann together with Lena Gercke hosted the show. In the tenth season, Annemarie Carpendale replaced Gercke as the new host, for the first stages. In the eleventh season, Melissa Khalaj in the semi-final and Steven Gätjen in the final, replaced Schölermann. Since 2022, Schölermann together with Melissa Khalaj hosted the show. The coaches for the most recent season were Mark Forster, Rea Garvey, Stefanie Kloß and Peter Maffay. Other coaches from previous seasons include Nena, The BossHoss, Xavier Naidoo, Max Herre, Michi Beck & Smudo, Andreas Bourani, Michael Patrick Kelly, Alice Merton, Sido, Yvonne Catterfeld, Samu Haber, Nico Santos, Johannes Oerding and Sarah Connor. In the ninth season, Nico Santos was featured as an off-screen fifth coach for Comeback Stage contestants. Michael Schulte took over as the Comeback Stage coach for the tenth season and Elif Demirezer was in the eleventh season as the Comeback Stage coach. There was no Comeback Stage in the twelfth season. 

On 5 April 2013, the kids version of the show premiered on Sat.1 and has since continued for ten seasons. The eleventh season has been announced and will begin airing in 2023. On 23 December 2018, a seniors version of the show premiered on Sat.1. Two seasons aired before the show was canceled.

Format 
The Voice is a reality television series that features four coaches looking for a talented new artist, who could become a global superstar. As the title indicates the coaches judge their vocal ability and not their looks, personalities or stage presence. There are four different stages: producers' auditions, Blind auditions, Battle phase and live shows.

The first stage of the show is not broadcast. The producers of the show audition all the artists that submitted their selves through the form on the website. The selected by the producers artists proceed to the blind auditions where they have to perform for the coaches. Each coach has the length of the auditioner's performance (about one minute) to decide if he or she wants that singer on his or her team; if two or more judges want the same singer (as happens frequently), the singer has the final choice of coach. However, if no coach turns around then the artist is sent home.

Each team of singers is mentored and developed by its respective coach. In the second stage, called the battle phase, coaches have two of their team members battle against each other directly by singing the same song together, with the coach choosing which team member to advance from each of four individual "battles" into the first live round. Within that first live round, the surviving four acts from each team again compete head-to-head, with public votes determining one of two acts from each team that will advance to the final eight, while the coach chooses which of the remaining three acts comprises the other performer remaining on the team.

In the final phase, the remaining contestants (Final 32) compete against each other in live broadcasts. The television audience and the coaches have equal say 50/50 in deciding who moves on to the final 4 phase. With one team member remaining for each coach, the (final 4) contestants compete against each other in the finale with the outcome decided solely by public vote.

In Season 2, the battle format was extended into the live shows. The eight contestants in one team competed in battles until one finalist is left. The winner of these battle was selected by a 50%-mixture of a coach and televoting.

In Season 3, the live show battle format was abolished after it was criticized that popular contestants had to compete against each other. The number of live shows was reduced from six to four. The knockout round where contestants who succeeded from battle rounds compete for live shows was introduced in this season. It was first seen in the third season of the American The Voice. The Cross-battle was also introduced in season 3 and was extended to season 4. In season 5, four contestants received the highest vote from the public advanced to the Live Finals regardless of what team they are from. But from the sixth season onwards, only one contestant from each team who received the highest vote out of their teams' top 3 was sent to the finals.

In the earlier seasons up to Season 8, artists that are not selected by any of the coaches leave the stage immediately after their song and do not talk with the coaches. However, in Season 9, the show added a brand new phase of competition called The Voice: Comeback Stage by SEAT that was exclusive to thevoiceofgermany.de. It was shown for the first time in the fifteenth season of the American version. After failing to turn a chair in the blind auditions or eliminated from battles and sing offs, artists had the chance to be selected by fifth online-coach to become a member of his person team. The two winners will compete in the live shows against the talents of the main coaches live on TV and so they can The Voice of Germany win.

Production 

In early April 2011, it was announced that ProSieben and Sat.1 bought the rights for the show. Devised by John de Mol, the creator of Big Brother, The Voice is based on the Dutch TV programme The Voice of Holland and is part of The Voice franchise, being based on the similar British and American format. In July 2011, ProSieben and Sat.1 began announcements of the coaches for the series. The first season aired in 2011-12 network television schedule. After a successful Season 1, Prosieben and Sat.1 decided to run another season in 2012. After the successful ratings in the blind auditions in Season 2, Prosieben and Sat.1 announced a third season in 2013. In December 2013, it was announced a fourth season, which began airing in October 2014. In June 2015, Prosieben and Sat.1 announced the fifth season for the 2015-16 network television schedule.

In the final of the fifth season, it was announced the sixth season for 2017. During the seventh season, it was announced that there would be an eighth season in 2018. In the final of season 8, it was announced by the presenter the ninth season. On 3 November 2019, it was announced the tenth season or the anniversary season which will premiere on 2020. On 16 June 2020, Sat.1 announced that the anniversary series of the casting show The Voice of Germany will have more episodes than before.

Coaches and presenters

Coaches
On 11 July 2011, ProSieben and Sat.1 announced that Nena and Xavier Naidoo are the first two coaches for the first season. On 25 August 2011, Rea Garvey and the duo Boss Burns (Alec Völkel) & Hoss Power (Sascha Vollmer) from the band The BossHoss were announced as the remaining two coaches. All four coaches returned for the second season. Naidoo and Garvey did not return for season three and were replaced by Samu Haber and Max Herre. On 18 March 2014, Völkel and Vollmer from the band The BossHoss announced that they would no longer be coaches for the fourth season. Five days later, Nena also announced her exit from the show. On 27 March 2014, Michi Beck & Smudo from the band Die Fantastischen Vier were announced as The BossHoss replacement. On 3 April 2014, Haber announced on Facebook that he would coach in the fourth season. On 6 May 2014, it was announced that Herre had left the show, but Garvey returned after one season hiatus. On 3 July, Silbermond frontwoman Stefanie Kloss announced that she would replace Nena. In early May 2015, Haber announced that he would not be a coach on the fifth season. He was replaced by Andreas Bourani. The other three coaches remained on the show.

On 30 April 2016, it was announced that Garvey would leave the show and Haber would return for the sixth season, after one season hiatus. On 14 June 2016, it was announced that Michi & Smudo and Bourani would continue as coaches, whereas Kloss was replaced by Yvonne Catterfeld. For the seventh season, Bourani was replaced by The Voice Kids coach Mark Forster. Catterfeld, Haber and Michi & Smudo all returned. In May 2018, Haber's managementconfirmed that he would not be a coach for the eighth season. He was replaced by Michael Patrick Kelly. Catterfeld, Forster and Michi & Smudo all returned as coaches. On 7 April 2019, Michi & Smudo announced their departure from The Voice of Germany after five seasons. In May, Catterfeld and Kelly also announced their exits. On 26 May 2019, it was announced that Forster would remain as coach, Garvey would return as coach after a three-season hiatus, whereas Alice Merton and Sido would be joining the show for the first time. On 21 August 2019, it was announced that Nico Santos would also join season nine as the fifth coach for the Comeback Stage of the competition. This would increase the number of finalists from 4 to 5.

In June 2020, it was announced that Sido and Merton would not be in the anniversary series of The Voice of Germany. On 17 July 2020, it was announced that the anniversary season will include six coaches: 2 solo coaches and 2 duo coaches. The two solos were Forster and Santos and the two duos were Catterfeld & Kloss and Haber & Garvey. On 21 July 2020, it was announced that Michael Schulte would be the new Comeback Stage coach. On 9 June 2021, ProSieben and Sat.1 announced that Garvey, Haber, Kloss and Catterfeld would not be returning for the eleventh season. On 25 June 2021, ProSieben and Sat.1 announced that Johannes Oerding and Sarah Connor as new coaches of the eleventh season, with Forster and Santos returning, and Elif Demirezer as the new "Comeback Stage" coach. On 13 April 2022, it was announced that Santos, Connor and Oerding would not be returning for the twelfth season, whereas Forster would be continuing. On 12 May 2022, it was announced that Garvey and Kloss would be returning as coaches for the twelfth series, and Peter Maffay was confirmed as the new coach. In addition, after 3 seasons, it was confirmed that there would be no Comeback Stage coach. Hence, the number of finalists would be down to 4 once again.

Notes

  Rea Garvey and Samu Haber featured together as a duo coaching team in the tenth season.
  Stefanie Kloss and Yvonne Catterfeld featured together as a duo coaching team in the tenth season.
  Nico Santos featured as the "Comeback Stage" coach in the ninth season, and then as a main coach from the tenth season onwards.
  Michael Schulte was the "Comeback Stage" coach in the tenth season.
  Elif is the "Comeback Stage" coach in the eleventh season.

Presenters
Stefan Gödde was announced as the host of the program in July 2011. Since season two, actor Thore Schölermann hosts the show. From the fifth season until the eleventh season, Schölermann and model Lena Gercke hosted together the show. Since season 12, Schölermann and Melissa Khalaj will host together the show.

From season one until season four, Doris Golpashin was as the show's social media correspondent during the live shows.

In the tenth season TV presenter Annemarie Carpendale hosted the show, only for the blind auditions, battle rounds and sing offs, replacing Gercke, who was pregnant. Gercke returned in the live shows. In the eleventh season, Schölermann could not be in the semi-final and final, because his wife Jana Schölermann was pregnant. Melissa Khalaj represented him in the semi-final, and Steven Gätjen in the final.

Coaches and finalists 
 Color key
 Winner
 Runner-up
 Third place
 Fourth place
 Fifth place

 Warning: the following table presents a significant amount of different colors.
 Winners are in bold, the finalists in the finale are in italicized font, and the eliminated artists are in small font.

Coaches' advisors
From the first season until the fourth the coaches' advisors was in the Battle rounds and from season six until season twelve were in the Sing Offs.

Series overview 
Warning: the following table presents a significant amount of different colors.

Season 1 (2011–2012) 

The first season of the show was aired from 24 November 2011 to 10 February 2012. The first season was moderated by Stefan Gödde and backstage by Doris Golpashin. The coaches were pop musician Nena, soul singer Xavier Naidoo, singer and guitarist Rea Garvey, and duo Alec Völkel and Sascha Vollmer from the band The BossHoss. The winner was Ivy Quainoo from Team BossHoss.

Ivy Quainoo debuted at No. 2 on the German Media Control charts with her debut single "Do You Like What You See", while the other three finalists also made it into the top 20.

Season 2 (2012) 

The second season of The Voice of Germany aired from 18 October to 14 December 2012. The second season was moderated by Thore Schölermann. The four coaches and the backstage presenter remained the same as in season one. The winner of the second season was Nick Howard with his song "Unbreakable".

Season 3 (2013) 

The third season of The Voice of Germany was aired from 17 October to 20 December 2013. In addition to the previous coaches Nena and the duo from The BossHoss, the coaches included rapper and music producer Max Herre and songwriter, singer and guitarist Samu Haber. The third season was moderated again by Thore Schölermann and backstage by Doris Golpashin. The winner was Andreas Kümmert with his song Simple Man.

Season 4 (2014) 

The fourth season was aired from 9 October to 12 December 2014. Samu Haber returned as coach and with Rea Garvey, who was also in the first two seasons a coach, Stefanie Kloß and Michi Beck & Smudo. This season was again hosted by Thore Schölermann and the backstage presenter was Doris Golpashin. The winner of the fourth season was Charley Ann Schmutzler from team Michi & Smudo with her song "Blue Heart".

Season 5 (2015) 

The fifth season was aired from 15 October to 17 December 2015. Rea Garvey, Stefanie Kloß, and Michi & Smudo returned as coaches and with Andreas Bourani as the new coach. This season had two main presenters Thore Schölermann and Lena Gercke. The winner of the fifth season was Jamie-Lee Kriewitz from team Michi & Smudo with her song "Ghost", which was also the German contribution to the Eurovision Song Contest 2016 a few months later. There Kriewitz reached the last place with 11 points.

Season 6 (2016) 

The sixth season began airing on 20 October and ended on 18 December 2016. From the previous season, Michi & Smudo, and Andreas Bourani returned as coaches. Samu Haber and Yvonne Catterfeld replaced Rea Garvey and Stefanie Kloss. Thore Schölermann and Lena Gercke both returned as the hosts. On 15 September 2016, it was announced that the show would be broadcast on ProSieben on Thursdays and on Sat.1 on Sundays. The winner of the sixth season was Tay Schmedtmann from team Andreas.

Season 7 (2017) 

The seventh season started on 19 October and ended on 17 December 2017. Yvonne Catterfeld, Samu Haber as well as Michi & Smudo returned as coaches. Andreas Bourani was replaced by Mark Forster. Also hosts Thore Schölermann and Lena Gercke remained on the show. The winner was Natia Todua from team Samu. None of the finalists sang their original song this year.

Season 8 (2018) 

The eighth season of the show was aired from 18 October to 16 December 2018. Yvonne Catterfeld, Mark Forster, and Michi & Smudo were joined by Michael Patrick Kelly, who replaced Samu Haber. Host Lena Gercke and Thore Schölermann remained. The Winner was Samuel Rösch from Michael Patrick Kelly's Team.

Season 9 (2019) 

The ninth season began on 12 September and ended on 10 November 2019. Returning coach Mark Forster, was joined by Rea Garvey, who returned after a 3-year hiatus, and new coaches Alice Merton and Sido. For the first time in the show's history, the season featured a fifth coach, Nico Santos, who selected contestants who did not turn a chair in the Blind Auditions or was eliminated from later rounds of the competition, to participate in Comeback Stage by SEAT. Thore Schölermann and Lena Gercke remained as the presenters. The winner was Claudia Emmanuela Santoso from Team Alice.

Season 10 (2020) 

The ten-year anniversary season began airing on 8 October 2020. Mark Forster returned as a coach, while Yvonne Catterfeld & Stefanie Kloß returned to the show, this time as a duo. Samu Haber & Rea Garvey also coached as a duo. Nico Santos moved from the online-coach to a full-time coach. Finally, Michael Schulte joined the show as the online-coach, replacing Santos. Thore Schölermann and Lena Gercke continued hosting. Gercke this season hosted only the live shows, due to pregnancy. In the other stages of the show, Schölermann was joined by Annemarie Carpendale. The winner was Paula Dalla Corte from Team Samu & Rea.

Season 11 (2021) 

The eleventh season began airing on 7 October 2021 and concluded on 19 December 2021. Mark Forster and Nico Santos returned as coaches and were joined by new coaches Johannes Oerding and Sarah Connor. Elif Demirezer was the fifth coach, who selected contestants who were eliminated from the competition, to participate in the Comeback Stage by SEAT. Thore Schölermann and Lena Gercke returned as the presenters. The winner was Sebastian Krenz from Team Johannes.

Season 12 (2022) 

The twelfth season began airing on 18 August 2022 and concluded on 4 November 2022. On 12 May 2022, it was announced that Rea Garvey, Mark Forster, & Stefanie Kloß would all return for their seventh, sixth, and fourth season, respectively. They were joined by a new coach, Peter Maffay. The winner was Anny Ogrezeanu from Team Mark.

Reception

Critical reception 
In the media, the casting show met some critical voices. In the selection of candidates is prefiltered, so that conspicuously many candidates look attractive or bring along moving stories.

The contracts of the participants were also criticized. During the TV show, the candidates are usually prescribed which songs they have to sing. Even after the end of the show, they are bound to the Universal Music Group. The financial terms up to and including the third album by the TV show were not negotiable.

Ratings

Awards and nominations

References

External links 
 Official website on ProSieben.de
 The Voice of Germany on fernsehserien.de

 
2011 German television series debuts
ProSieben original programming
Sat.1 original programming
German-language television shows